is a 1973 Japanese film directed by Masanobu Deme. It received a theatrical release in Japan on 7 July 1973 where it was distributed by Toho. The film received the award for Best Art Direction (Shinobu Muraki) at the Mainichi Film Concours.

Cast
 Komaki Kurihara as Chika
 Go Kato as Yozo
 Kyoko Maya
Misako Watanabe
Choichiro Kawarazaki
Eitaro Ozawa

See also
List of Japanese films of 1973

Footnotes

Sources

External links
 
 

Toho films
1970s Japanese-language films
1970s Japanese films